The QF 6-inch Gun Mark N5 (initially designated QF 6-inch Mk V) was a British naval gun, which was developed in the post-war period. It was the last large gun to be operational with the Royal Navy.

Development 
The development of the Mark V gun started during the Second World War and was intended for triple Mark 25 mountings on the projected Neptune-class cruisers. When the Neptune-class ships were cancelled in 1946, the gun was redesigned to be mounted in pairs to the new and complex Mark 26 dual purpose mounting and gun turret designed for rapid automatic fire on the projected Minotaur-class cruiser. These were to be the first British 6-inch guns in over sixty years to use brass cartridges instead of bagged charges. By the time the first two experimental weapons had been completed in 1949, the Minotaur-class had also been cancelled, and after some time it was decided to use the N5 gun (as the Mark V had been redesignated) and the Mark 26 mounting, on the Tiger-class cruisers, whose hulls had been built during the war and had since been totally redesigned. Initial trials were undertaken at the Shoeburyness ranges on the Essex coast.

A prototype of the complete gun, mounting and turret system was mounted on the former heavy cruiser, HMS Cumberland, which had been converted to a trials ship in 1949–1951. The turret was mounted in the "B" (forward, upper) position, while mounted on the "X" position (aft, upper) was a twin Vickers Ordnance QF 3in Mark N1 gun which was also under development for the Tiger-class. In April 1957, Cumberland sailed for the Mediterranean for firing trials, during which she expended 645 6-inch rounds.

The guns were operated in conjunction with the Gun Direction System (GDS1) and a Type 992 radar. The cruisers were to carry two twin 6-inch mounts, fore and aft, and together with the ships' 3-inch guns, was intended to be able to fire a barrage of 800 shells per minute.

Service 
The guns entered service with the Royal Navy when HMS Tiger was commissioned in 1959. The weapon system gained a reputation for unreliability and difficult maintenance, however the main problem was the number of technicians required to keep the guns operational. This was especially true of the earlier hydraulically actuated mountings, later versions were electrically operated. Two of the ships, HMS Blake in 1969 and HMS Tiger in 1972, underwent a radical conversion which replaced the aft 6-inch turret with a helicopter flight deck and hangar. These two ships remained in service until December 1979 when Blake fired her guns for the last time in the English Channel; they were the last 6-inch guns ever to be fired from a British warship.

References

External links 
 British Pathé newsreel showing HMS Tiger working-up in 1959, including firing the main armament.

Naval anti-aircraft guns
Naval guns of the United Kingdom
152 mm artillery